Michèle Monier (born 16 July 1946) is a French football player who played as midfielder for French club  Stade de Reims of the Division 1 Féminine.

International career

Monier represented France in the first FIFA sanctioned women's international against the Netherlands on April 17, 1971. Monier  represented France at the 1971 Women's World Cup.

References

1946 births
Stade de Reims Féminines players
French women's footballers
France women's international footballers
Division 1 Féminine players
Women's association football midfielders
Living people